Oleksiy Yuriyovych Malaki (born 28 February 2003) is a Ukrainian professional footballer who plays as a left-back for Ukrainian First League club Hirnyk-Sport Horishni Plavni, on loan from Kolos Kovalivka.

References

External links
 
 

2003 births
Living people
People from Obukhiv
Ukrainian footballers
Association football defenders
FC Kolos Kovalivka players
FC Hirnyk-Sport Horishni Plavni players
Ukrainian First League players